Vyacheslav Aleksandrovich Skok (born 3 September 1946 in Rzhev) is a Russian water polo player, who competed for the Soviet Union in the 1968 Summer Olympics.

See also
 List of Olympic medalists in water polo (men)

External links
 

1946 births
Living people
Soviet male water polo players
Russian male water polo players
Olympic water polo players of the Soviet Union
Water polo players at the 1968 Summer Olympics
Olympic silver medalists for the Soviet Union
Olympic medalists in water polo
People from Rzhev
Medalists at the 1968 Summer Olympics